is a 1981 Japanese pink film directed by Genji Nakamura. Considered one of the most important pink film makers of the 1980s, this is judged to be one of Nakamura's best films as an independent director. Nakamura later made films in Nikkatsu's Roman Porno series, and then directed some of the earliest major gay-themed pink films for ENK.

Synopsis
A gang boss orders the execution of a prostitute who witnessed a murder. When the boss' henchman discovers the prostitute is actually blind, he falls in love with her and protects her. The prostitute regains her sight just in time to see the death of her boyfriend. At his funeral, overcome with feelings of mixed joy and grief, she secretly masturbates.

Cast
 Yuka Asagiri
 Maria Satsuki
 Rima Aono
 Atsushi Imaizumi
 Ren Aosugi
 Kenji Uchimura
 Yōichi Iijima
 Tarō Iwate

Critical appraisal
In their Japanese Cinema Encyclopedia: The Sex Films, Thomas and Yuko Mihara Weisser give Scarlet Prostitute: Stabbing a rating of three and-a-half out of four stars, writing that director Genji Nakamura handles the far-fetched plot in a skillful way, evoking strong emotions out of the material. According to the Weissers, Nakamura's direction gives the film a "high-level tension punctuated by intricately drawn characters". The depiction of the blind prostitute's daily life is judged to be particularly effective. The final scene in which the prostitute masturbates at her boyfriend's funeral is singled out as especially moving. Though this was a controversial scene at the time of the film's release, the Weissers write that it has "an erotic yet melancholy effect on the audience. Even the most calloused viewer will become misty-eyed."

Bibliography

English

Japanese

Notes

1981 films
Million Film films
1980s Japanese-language films
Pink films
1980s Japanese films